In computer science and automata theory, a Weak Büchi automaton is a formalism which represents a set of infinite words. A Weak Büchi automaton is a modification of Büchi automaton such that for all pair of states  and  belonging to the same strongly connected component,   is accepting  if and only if  is accepting.

A Büchi automaton accepts a word  if there exists a run, such that at least one state occurring infinitely often in the final state set . For Weak Büchi automata, this condition is equivalent to the existence of a run which ultimately stays in the set of accepting states.

Weak Büchi automata are strictly less-expressive than Büchi automata and than Co-Büchi automata.

Properties
The deterministic Weak Büchi automata can be minimized in time  .

The languages accepted by Weak Büchi automata are closed under union and intersection but not under complementation. For example,  can be recognised by a Weak Büchi automaton but its complement  cannot.

Non-deterministic Weak Büchi automata are more expressive than Weak Büchi automata. As an example, the language  can be decided by a Weak Büchi automaton but by no deterministic Büchi automaton.

References

 

Automata (computation)